P. Lingam is an Indian politician and former member of the Parliament of India from Tenkasi Constituency from 2009 to 2014. He represents the Communist Party of India party.

References 

Living people
India MPs 2009–2014
Communist Party of India politicians from Tamil Nadu
Lok Sabha members from Tamil Nadu
People from Tirunelveli district
Year of birth missing (living people)